George John Hausmann (February 11, 1916 – June 16, 2004) was a second baseman in Major League Baseball. He played for the New York Giants.

References

External links

1916 births
2004 deaths
Major League Baseball second basemen
New York Giants (NL) players
Baseball players from St. Louis
Minor league baseball managers
Wichita Indians players
Austin Pioneers players